Southwest Tennessee Community College is a public community college in Memphis, Tennessee. As the product of a merger between two colleges in 2000, the school has two campuses in Memphis and several satellite centers. It is operated by the Tennessee Board of Regents.

History

The college resulted from the 2000 merger between two institutions, the former Shelby State Community College and the former State Technical Institute at Memphis ("STIM"). Nathan Essex, the school's founding president, announced in 2014 that he would retire the next summer.

The merger was an attempt to reduce the overhead of maintaining two separate institutional managements and a recognition of the increasing convergence of academic and technical education. It also has made credits earned at the former Technical Institute more readily transferable to other institutions of higher learning, which was an additional goal of the merger. Southwest is one of the largest two-year colleges operated by the Tennessee Board of Regents.

Southwest Tennessee Community College is a comprehensive, multicultural, public, open-access college. Southwest is accredited by the Commission on Colleges of the Southern Association of Colleges and Schools.

Presidents
Charles M. Temple (president, State Technical institute at Memphis, 1983–1995)
M. Douglas Call (president, Shelby State Community college-2000)
Floyd "Bud" Amann (president Shelby State Community college 1996–2000)
Floyd "Bud" Amann (president Southwest Tennessee Community College 2000–2001)
Nathan Essex (president 2001–2015)
Tracy D. Hall (president 2015–present)

Campuses
Southwest has several campuses and centers. These include:
Macon Cove Campus- located in Northeast Memphis
Union Avenue Campus- located in Downtown Memphis
Medical District High School is located in Building E.
Gill Center- located in Frayser
Maxine A. Smith Center- located in Southeast Memphis
Millington Center- located in Millington, Tennessee
Whitehaven Center- located in Whitehaven

Athletics
The college maintains collegiate sports teams in the following sports: 
Men's basketball
Women's basketball
Baseball
Softball
Women's soccer
Cheerleading

The mascot is the Saluqi.

Both basketball teams have a winning tradition and regularly advance to the national tournaments.  Basketball games are played at the Verties Sails Gymnasium on the Union Avenue Campus.

The Saluqi's baseball program plays at USA Stadium in Millington, Tennessee.

References

External links
 Official website

Community colleges in Tennessee
Universities and colleges in Memphis, Tennessee
Educational institutions established in 2000
Universities and colleges accredited by the Southern Association of Colleges and Schools
Education in Fayette County, Tennessee
Education in Shelby County, Tennessee
NJCAA athletics
2000 establishments in Tennessee